The Rural City of Horsham is a local government area in Victoria, Australia, located in the western part of the state. It includes the towns of Brimpaen, Dadswells Bridge, Dooen, Haven, Horsham, Laharum, Natimuk, Noradjuha and Pimpinio. It was formed in 1995 by the amalgamation of the City of Horsham, most of the Shire of Wimmera and Shire of Arapiles, and part of the Shire of Kowree.

The Rural City is governed and administered by the Horsham Rural City Council; its seat of local government and administrative centre is located at the council headquarters in Horsham. The Rural City is named after the main urban settlement located in the north-east of the LGA, that is Horsham, which is also the LGA's most populous urban centre with a population of 16,514.

The city was winner of Australia's tidiest town in 2001. There is a shopping precinct that offers coffee shops and restaurants. Horsham is the capital of the region and hosts events from sport to cultural interests. The Horsham golf course is known as country Victoria's best, as awarded from the pro-am circuit. The region is the site of lakes and a Wimmera River system and in normal seasons is popular with fishing, boating, swimming and water enthusiasts.

Traditional owners 
There are multiple traditional owners of this land, they are Jaadwa, Jadawadjali, Jupagulk, Wergaia and Wotjobaluk people.

Council

Current composition
The council is composed of seven councillors elected to represent an unsubdivided municipality. The current councillors, in order of election at the 2020 election, are:

Administration and governance
The council meets in the council chambers at the council headquarters in the Horsham Civic Centre, which is also the location of the council's administrative activities. It also provides customer services at its administrative centre in Horsham.

Townships and localities
The 2021 census, the rural city had a population of 20,429 up from 19,642 in the 2016 census

^ - Territory divided with another LGA
* - Not noted in 2016 Census
# - Not noted in 2021 Census

See also
 List of places on the Victorian Heritage Register in the Rural City of Horsham
Wotjobaluk, Jaadwa, Jadawadjali, Wergaia and Jupagulk Peoples v Victoria

References

External links

 Horsham Rural City Council official website
 Official tourist website for Horsham
 Metlink local public transport map
 Link to Land Victoria interactive maps

Local government areas of Victoria (Australia)
Grampians (region)
 
Wimmera